Gongsun Long (BC), courtesy name Zibing (子秉), was a Chinese philosopher and writer who was a member of the School of Names (Logicians) of ancient Chinese philosophy. He also ran a school and enjoyed the support of rulers, and advocated peaceful means of resolving disputes in contrast to the wars which were common in the Warring States period. However, little is known about the particulars of his life, and furthermore many of his writings have been lost. All of his essays—fourteen originally but only six extant—are included in the anthology the Gongsun Longzi.

In Book 17 of the Zhuangzi anthology, Gongsun thus speaks of himself:

When young, I studied the way of the former kings. When I grew up, I understood the practice of kindness and duty. I united the same and different, separated hard from white, made so the not-so and admissible the inadmissible. I confounded the wits of the hundred schools and exhausted the eloquence of countless speakers. I took myself to have reached the ultimate.

He is best known for a series of paradoxes in the tradition of Hui Shi, including "White horses are not horses," "When no thing is not the pointed-out, to point out is not to point out," and "There is no 1 in 2." These paradoxes seem to suggest a similarity to the discovery in Greek philosophy that pure logic may lead to apparently absurd conclusions.

White Horse Dialogue

In the White Horse Dialogue, one interlocutor (sometimes called the "sophist") defends the truth of the statement "White horses are not horses," while the other interlocutor (sometimes called the "objector") disputes the truth of this statement. This has been interpreted in a number of ways.

Possibly the simplest interpretation is to see it as based on a confusion of class and identity. The argument, by this interpretation, plays upon an ambiguity in Chinese that does not exist in English. The expression "X is not Y" (X非Y) can mean either
 "X is not a member (or subset) of set Y"
 "X is not identical to Y"

The sentence "White horses are not horses" would normally be taken to assert the obviously false claim that white horses are not part of the group of horses. However, the "sophist" in the dialogue defends the statement under the interpretation, "Not all horses are white horses". The latter statement is actually true, since—as the "sophist" explains—"horses" includes horses that are white, yellow, brown, etc., while "white horses" includes only white horses, and excludes the others. A.C. Graham proposed this interpretation and illustrated it with an analogy.  The "Objector" assumes that "a white horse is not a horse" is parallel to "a sword is not a weapon," but the "Sophist" is treating the statement as parallel to "a sword is not a blade." Other interpretations have been put forward by Fung Yu-lan and Chad Hansen, among others.

This work has been viewed by some as a serious logical discourse, by others as a facetious work of sophistry, and finally by some as a combination of the two.

Other works
He was also responsible for several other essays, as short as 300 characters.
 "On Pointing at Things": An enigmatic discussion on reference and the referent, or designation and the designated.
 "On Understanding Change"
 "On Hardness and Whiteness": based on the example of a stone that is both hard and white.
 "On Name and Substance"
 "Storehouse of Traces"

Popular culture
He appears in the manga and anime Kingdom as a Zhao general by the name "Kou Son Ryuu".

Notes

References
 Graham, Angus C. (1989). 'The Sharpening of Rational Debate: The Sophists.' Pp. 75–95 in Graham, Disputers of the Tao. Chicago: Open Court Press.
 Liu, Jianguo (2004). Distinguishing and Correcting the pre-Qin Forged Classics. Xi'an: Shaanxi People's Press. .
 Zhou, Yunzhi, "Gongsun Long". Encyclopedia of China (Philosophy Edition), 1st ed.

External links
 
 
 Full text of the Gongsun Longzi at the Chinese Text Project (text in Chinese mostly; except the White Horse Discourse, which has English glosses).
 .
 Translation of the Gong Sun Long Zi  by Nuño Valenzuela

320s BC births
250 BC deaths
3rd-century BC Chinese philosophers
Ancient linguists
Chinese logicians
Mohism
People from North China
Philosophers of language
School of Names
Zhou dynasty essayists
Zhou dynasty philosophers